Standings and results for Group 2 of the UEFA Euro 1992 qualifying tournament.

Group 2 consisted of Bulgaria, Romania, San Marino, Scotland and Switzerland.

Final table

Results

Goalscorers

References
UEFA website

Attendances - 

Group 2
1990–91 in Scottish football
1991–92 in Scottish football
Scotland at UEFA Euro 1992
1990–91 in Swiss football
1991–92 in Swiss football
1990–91 in Bulgarian football
1991–92 in Bulgarian football
1990–91 in San Marino football
1991–92 in San Marino football
1990–91 in Romanian football
1991–92 in Romanian football